Kim Jong-sun (born 23 January 1931) is a South Korean former speed skater. He competed in three events at the 1956 Winter Olympics.

References

External links
 

1931 births
Living people
South Korean male speed skaters
Olympic speed skaters of South Korea
Speed skaters at the 1956 Winter Olympics
Place of birth missing (living people)